Murunducaris juneae is a species of crustacean in the family Parastenocarididae. It is endemic to Brazil.

References

Harpacticoida
Fauna of Brazil
Freshwater crustaceans of South America
Endemic fauna of Brazil
Taxonomy articles created by Polbot
Crustaceans described in 1994